The 1985 Mid Glamorgan County Council election were held in May 1985 and were the fourth full elections to Mid Glamorgan County Council, electing 85 councillors. They were preceded by the 1981 elections and followed by the 1989 elections.

Ward Results

Aberdare No.1: Llwydcoed (two seats)

Aberdare No.2: Blaengwawr (one seat)

Aberdare No.3: Gadlys (one seat)

Aberdare No.4: Town (one seat)

Aberdare No.5: Aberaman (one seat)

Abertridwr and Senghennydd

Bedwas and Machen (two seats)

Bedwellty No.1 Aberbargoed (one seat)

Bedwellty No.2 Abertysswg (one seat)

Bridgend (two seats)

Caerphilly No.1 (one seat)

Caerphilly No.2 Llanbradach (one seat)

Caerphilly No.4 (one seat)

Caerphilly No.5 North (one seat)

Caerphilly No.6 South (one seat)

Caerphilly No.7 (one seat)

Cardiff Rural (one seat)

Cowbridge Rural (one seat)

Dowlais (one seat)

Gelligaer No.1 (one seat)

Gelligaer No.2 (one seat)

Gelligaer No.3 (one seat)

Gelligaer No.4 (two seats)

Llantrisant and Llantwitfardre No.1 (four seats)

Llantrisant and Llantwitfardre No.2 (two seats)

Maesteg No.1 (one seat)

Maesteg No.2 (one seat)

Maesteg No.3 (one seat)

Merthyr, Cyfarthfa (one seat)
Phillips had been elected as a Plaid Cymru candidate at both the 1977 and 1981 elections.

Merthyr No.6 (one seat)

Merthyr No.7 (one seat)

Merthyr Park (two seats)

Merthyr Town (one seat)

Mountain Ash No.1 (one seat)

Mountain Ash No.2 (one seat)

Mountain Ash No.3 (two seats)

Ogmore and Garw No.1 (one seat)

Ogmore and Garw No.2 (two seats)

Penybont No.1 (one seat)

Penybont No.2 (one seat)

Penybont No.3 (one seat)

Penybont No.4 (one seat)

Penybont No.5 (two seats)

Penybont No.6 (two seats)

Penydarren (one seat)

Pontypridd No.1 (one seat)

Pontypridd No.2 Town (one seat)

Pontypridd No.3 (one seat)

Pontypridd No.4 Trallwn (one seat)

Pontypridd No.5 Rhydyfelin (one seat)

Pontypridd No.6 (one seat)

Porthcawl No.1 (one seat)

Porthcawl No.2 (one seat)

Rhondda No.1 Treherbert (two seats)

Rhondda No.2 Treorchy (two seats)

Rhondda No.3 Pentre (one seat)

Rhondda No.4 Ystrad (one seat)

Rhondda No.5 (one seat)

Rhondda No.6 (one seat)

Rhondda No.7 Penygraig (one seat)

Rhondda No.8 Porth (two seats)

Rhondda No.9 (one seat)

Rhondda No.10, Tylorstown (one seat)

Rhondda No.11 Ferndale (two seats)

Rhymney Lower, Middle and Upper (one seat)

Treharris (one seat)

Vaynor and Penderyn No.1 (one seat)

Vaynor and Penderyn No.2 (one seat)

References

Mid Glamorgan County Council election
Mid Glamorgan County Council elections